Joseph Huketick was a Belgian diver. He competed in the men's 10 metre platform event at the 1908 Summer Olympics.

References

Year of birth missing
Year of death missing
Belgian male divers
Olympic divers of Belgium
Divers at the 1908 Summer Olympics
Place of birth missing